Namrata Vaswani is an Indian-American electrical engineer known for her research in compressed sensing, robust principal component analysis, signal processing, statistical learning theory, and computer vision. She is a Joseph and Elizabeth Anderlik Professor in Electrical and Computer Engineering at Iowa State University, and (by courtesy) a professor of mathematics at Iowa State.

Education and career
Namrata Vaswani earned a bachelor's degree in electrical engineering at the Indian Institute of Technology Delhi in 1999. She completed a Ph.D. in electrical and computer engineering in 2004 at the University of Maryland, College Park. Her doctoral advisor was Rama Chellappa, and her dissertation was Change detection in stochastic shape dynamical models with applications in activity modeling and abnormality detection.

After postdoctoral research at the Georgia Institute of Technology, she joined the Iowa State faculty in 2005. She was given her courtesy appointment in mathematics in 2013, and the Anderlik Professorship in 2019.
She also chairs the Women in Signal Processing Committee of the IEEE Signal Processing Society.

Recognition
In 2018, Namrata  Vaswani was named a Fellow of the IEEE "for contributions to dynamic structured high-dimensional data recovery".. In 2019 she was named a distinguished alumni of the University of Maryland Electrical and Computer Engineering Department.

Achievements 
First, Namrata Vaswani was the first author who developed a dynamic RPCA method  in the L+S decomposition framework in 2010 just after the work of Candès et al.  in 2009 on RPCA via decomposition into low-rank and sparse matrices. She immediately understood the interest to develop a provable solution to the dynamic RPCA problem, and provided a usable dynamic RPCA method for real-time computer vision applications. Practically, she was a precursor and a pionner in this kind of dynamic RPCA methods. 

Second, Namrata Vaswani progressively improved over the years the original ReProCS by addressing both its performance guarantees and its memory efficiency. The last version of ReProCS called PracReProCS is the top method on the large-scale dataset CDnet 2014 (which is a reference in the field of change detection) in the category of dynamic RPCA methods provided with performance guarantees. In 2018, Prof. Namrata Vaswani designed MEROP  which is a fast and memory-efficient algorithm for RPCA. In addition, the code of PracReProCS and MEROP is publicly available for the scientific community. By this way, she shows her interest for a sharable and reproducible research. 

Third, Namrata Vaswani provided the first valuable unified synthesis/review on dynamic RPCA/subspace tracking algorithms in a mature paper, and she is also a GE of two special issues   in RPCA/dynamic RPCA via L+S decomposition showing by these activities her international leadership in this field. In addition, she also provided a very valuable invited talk at the workshop RSL-CV 2017 in conjunction with ICCV 2017 as well as many invited talks in seminars and an invited short-course at IIIT-Delhi showing her investment to diffuse as well as possible her research. She received the IEEE Signal Processing Society (SPS) Best Paper Award in 2014 for her paper on dynamic compressive sensing.

References

External links
Home page

Year of birth missing (living people)
Living people
Electrical engineering academics
American electrical engineers
Indian electrical engineers
American women engineers
Indian women engineers
IIT Delhi alumni
University of Maryland, College Park alumni
Iowa State University faculty
Fellow Members of the IEEE
American women academics
21st-century American women